Adolphe Wahltuch  (19 May 1837, Odessa – 25 November 1907, Manchester) was an Imperial Russian-born English physician and chess writer. He was known as a successful practitioner and as a prolific writer of medical works.

Biography
Wahltuch was born into a Jewish family in Odessa. He received his M.D. from the University of Kiev in 1860, whereupon he practised for about two years in his native city, and then went to Prague to obtain better clinical experience. At Prague he was a fellow student of Morell Mackenzie. From there, Wahltuch came to London, where he qualified as L.R.C.P. at the Middlesex Hospital in 1863.

Wahltuch then settled in Manchester as a practising physician. He would come to serve as consulting physician of Manchester's Victoria Jewish Hospital, honorary physician of the Hulme Dispensary, and president of the Manchester Clinical Society and of the Manchester Medico-Ethical Association. He was one of the founders of the Manchester Cremation Society, and was a frequent lecturer on hygiene and on scientific and historical subjects.

An avid chess player, Wahltuch edited the chess column in the Manchester Weekly Times, and founded several chess clubs in the city. His son, Victor Wahltuch, would become a well-known chess master.

He died at his residence at Rusholme, Manchester, on 25 November 1907. He was survived by his wife, Anna, and seven children.

Bibliography

References
 

1837 births
1907 deaths
19th-century British Jews
20th-century British Jews
British chess writers
English Jewish writers
English medical writers
English people of Ukrainian-Jewish descent
Emigrants from the Russian Empire to the United Kingdom
Physicians from the Russian Empire
Jewish scientists from the Russian Empire
Odesa Jews
People from Rusholme
Physicians of the Middlesex Hospital
Physicians from Odesa
Scientists from Manchester
Taras Shevchenko National University of Kyiv alumni
Writers from Manchester
Writers from Odesa